Marla Gibbs (born Margaret Theresa Bradley; June 14, 1931) is an American actress, singer, comedian, writer and television producer whose career spans seven decades. Gibbs is known for her role as George Jefferson's maid, Florence Johnston, in the CBS sitcom The Jeffersons (1975–1985), for which she received five nominations for the Primetime Emmy Award for Outstanding Supporting Actress in a Comedy Series.

Gibbs also starred in the show's spin-off Checking In (1981) and the NBC sitcom 227 (1985–1990); Gibbs co-produced the latter series, played the lead role of Mary Jenkins, and sang the theme song. Gibbs has won seven NAACP Image Awards. In later years, Gibbs played supporting roles in films The Meteor Man (1993), Lost & Found (1999), The Visit (2000), The Brothers (2001), Madea's Witness Protection (2012), Grantham & Rose (2015), and Lemon (2017) and the Shondaland-produced TV shows Station 19 (2018) and Grey's Anatomy (2022). In August 2021, Gibbs began playing Olivia Price on the NBC daytime drama Days of Our Lives.

Biography

Early life and education
Marla Gibbs was born Margaret Theresa Bradley in Chicago, Illinois at Cook County Hospital. The middle of three sisters, Gibbs was raised in the Bronzeville neighborhood on the city's south side. Her father, Douglas Bradley, a native of Waterproof, Louisiana (d. 1947) was a self-taught mechanic who owned an ice company. Her mother, Ophelia Birdie (née Kemp; d. 1967) was a businesswoman who occasionally ran numbers in the gambling trade. In 1936, Gibbs's parents divorced, with her mother remarrying Charles Cady and relocating to Detroit, Michigan. Gibbs and her siblings remained in Chicago with their father and grandmother Hattie Sims. Gibbs attended Corpus Christi Elementary School, graduating in 1945. 

After graduating from elementary school, Gibbs attended St. Elizabeth High School, where she completed her freshman year and first semester of her sophomore year. During the middle of her sophomore year, Gibbs transferred to Wendell Phillips Academy High School. When she was 16, her father died, and Gibbs was sent to live with her mother and step-father in Detroit, Michigan where she attended Northern High School for a semester during her junior year. After months in Detroit, Gibbs returned to Chicago, re-enrolling at Phillips where she graduated in June 1949. Several years later, Gibbs returned to Detroit, Michigan, where she attended Peters Business School.

Career
In 1963, Gibbs relocated to Los Angeles to recuperate from an ulcer, and began working as a reservations agent for United Airlines. She first acted in local Los Angeles black theater before she got her first acting job in the early 1970s, in the blaxploitation films Sweet Jesus, Preacher Man and  Black Belt Jones. In 1975, she was cast as Florence Johnston, the family's maid, in the CBS comedy series The Jeffersons. For the first two years of her acting job with CBS, Gibbs continued working at her job as a United Airlines reservations agent. She would work at the CBS television studio during the day and then go to United Airlines, where she worked the night shift. When the series became an established success, CBS requested that she take a leave of absence from her job at United Airlines.

Gibbs's performance on the series garnered her five nominations for a Primetime Emmy Award for Outstanding Supporting Actress in a Comedy Series, and one nomination for a Golden Globe Award for Best Supporting Actress – Series, Miniseries or Television Film. In 1981, she starred in the short-lived spin-off of The Jeffersons, titled Checking In. Gibbs responded in a 2015 interview on Broadway Showbiz, when asked if she'd based any of her characters on real-life people:
"Yes, Florence was like my aunt and grandmother so I lived it. She came easy to me so I'm like Florence in giving smart answers, but I was also shy so I wouldn't have dared to say some of the things Florence said. I prefer to do whatever I can do at the moment. Whoever's hiring me at the moment...that's what I'm supposed to do. My favorite is drama. I'm doing that now (on Scandal), but also still doing comedy on Hot in Cleveland." 

In 1985, when The Jeffersons was cancelled after 11 seasons, Gibbs was the lead actress in the NBC sitcom, 227. 227 was adapted from a play directed by Cambridge Players' then-president Ed Cambridge and was presented to NBC by Cambridge, at Gibbs's Crossroads Theater in L.A. He served as artistic director. The series aired until 1990, producing 116 episodes. Two decades later, Gibbs teamed again with former 227 co-star Jackée Harry in The First Family, where Gibbs had a recurring role as Harry's on-screen mother Grandma Eddy. Then, she again worked with Harry in the independent film Forbidden Woman.

Gibbs had a number of supporting film roles, and guest starred on The Fresh Prince of Bel-Air, Martin, Touched by an Angel (with Della Reese), Judging Amy, ER, and Southland. From 1998 to 2002 she had a recurring role on The Hughleys. In 2012, Gibbs appeared in the Tyler Perry film Madea's Witness Protection, and in 2014 she starred in the independent film, Grantham & Rose.

In 2015, Gibbs made two appearances in the Shonda Rhimes' drama series, Scandal. She later guest starred on Hot in Cleveland, American Horror Story: Hotel and This Is Us. In 2018, she was cast in a recurring role on the ABC drama series Station 19. Gibbs also has had starring roles in two television pilots: Old Soul alongside Ellen Burstyn and Rita Moreno for NBC in 2014, and ABC's Jalen Vs. Everybody in 2017. In film, she co-starred in Lemon and Please Stand By.
 In 2019, Gibbs reprised her role as Florence on Live in Front of a Studio Audience: Norman Lear's All in the Family and The Jeffersons, less than a month before her 88th birthday.

In 2021, Gibbs began appearing as Olivia Price in a recurring role on Days of Our Lives. That same year, for her contributions to the television industry, she was awarded a star on the Hollywood Walk of Fame.

Other ventures
Gibbs owned a jazz club in South Central L.A. called Marla's Memory Lane Jazz and Supper Club from 1981 to 1999. As a singer, she released a number of albums. In 1990, she moved her Crossroads Arts Academy and Theatre into the former Leimert Theatre in Los Angeles. Plans included the construction of a second stage, but the project ended in debt in June 1997.

Personal life
Gibbs has been married once, to her high school sweetheart Jordan Gibbs from 1955 to 1973; the couple had three children: Angela, Dorian and Joseph. Her older sister is the late actress Susie Garrett, who played Cherie's grandmother Betty Johnson on the NBC series Punky Brewster. Her daughter Angela, also an actress, appeared on the TV show Sanford and Son and films such as Together Brothers,  Drumline and Think Like A Man Too. On July 31, 2014, Gibbs attended the Leimert Park Village Book Fair in Los Angeles, California, to pay tribute to Maya Angelou, who died on May 28, and Ruby Dee, who died on June 11. On January 11, 2016, Gibbs and former 227 co-star, Jackée Harry, attended the funeral of Grammy Award-winning singer Natalie Cole at the West Angeles Church of God in Christ in Los Angeles, California. Gibbs co-starred opposite Cole in the television film Lily in Winter.

Filmography

Film

Television

References

External links

 
 
 
 Image of Tom Bradley and Marla Gibbs passing his Crenshaw campaign headquarters during a parade in Los Angeles, California, 1989. Los Angeles Times Photographic Archive (Collection 1429). UCLA Library Special Collections, Charles E. Young Research Library, University of California, Los Angeles.

1931 births
20th-century American actresses
21st-century American actresses
Actresses from Chicago
Actresses from Detroit
Activists for African-American civil rights
African-American actresses
African-American Christians
African-American female comedians
American women comedians
African-American women singer-songwriters
American film actresses
American jazz singers
American soap opera actresses
American stage actresses
American television actresses
American women television personalities
Television producers from Illinois
American women television producers
American television writers
American voice actresses
California Democrats
Living people
Singers from Chicago
20th-century American businesswomen
20th-century American businesspeople
Singers from Detroit
Comedians from Illinois
Activists from California
Screenwriters from Illinois
Jazz musicians from Illinois
Jazz musicians from Michigan
American women television writers
African-American screenwriters
20th-century African-American women singers
Singer-songwriters from Illinois
Singer-songwriters from Michigan